Fresh Blood is the second studio album by the English singer-songwriter Steve Swindells. The album was originally released in late 1980 on the label Atco. The album was Swindells' first solo album following his departure from Hawkwind, due to an offer that had been made to him by Atco to make this album. It was produced by Swindells himself, after being unable to afford advances offered by Jim Steinman, Jimmy Iovine, and David Bowie. Bowie would later praise the album, along with Messages as sounding "pretty good"

When the album was released in late 1980, it received positive reviews but failed to chart in the UK. "Shot Down in the Night", and "Turn It On, Turn It Off" were released as singles, but they both also failed to chart. He was later dropped from the label, when it failed to make sufficient sales.

Swindells is backed on this album by guitarist Huw Lloyd-Langton and drummer Simon King, both from Hawkwind, and bassist Nic Potter from Van der Graaf Generator.

Critical reception

Retrospective review
Fresh Blood received positive reviews from contemporary music critics. In a retrospective review for AllMusic, critic Dave Thompson gave the album three and a half out of five stars and wrote that "Swindells' Fresh Blood heralded the coming rise of the keyboard, while gallantly introducing the immediate musical past -- punk and New Wave, to the future. But the future wasn't beckoning him; a tad too ahead of his time for the U.S., and just a step behind the times for the U.K., this fabulous album sunk with little trace and even less interest from his label. Swept in the cross-currents of its time, the set still sounds surprisingly fresh today, and in hindsight even more glorious."

Track listing

Personnel
 Steve Swindells – vocals; keyboards; synthesizers
 Huw Lloyd-Langton – electric guitar
 Nic Potter – bass guitar
 Simon King – drums

Covers
 The Who's lead vocalist Roger Daltrey covered two tracks from this album, "Bitter and Twisted" on the 1980 soundtrack to the film McVicar, and "Don't Wait on the Stairs" on his 1984 album Parting Should Be Painless.
 "Shot Down in the Night" had originally been written for Hawkwind while Swindells was in the band in 1979. Hawkwind released their own live version of the track as a single and on the 1980 album Live Seventy Nine.

Release history
October 1980: Atco Records, UK: K50738, USA: SD38-128, vinyl
27 July 2009: Atomhenge (Cherry Red) Records, ATOMCD1015, UK CD

References

External links

Atomhenge Records

Steve Swindells albums
1980 albums
Atco Records albums